Duchess Marie Elisabeth of Saxony  (22 November 1610 – 24 October 1684) was duchess consort of Holstein-Gottorp as the spouse of Duke Friedrich III of Holstein-Gottorp. As a widow, she became known as a patron of culture.

Biography 
She was a daughter of John George I, Elector of Saxony, and his spouse Princess Magdalene Sibylle of Prussia. She was engaged in 1627 and married in 1630. Her marriage was arranged by the Danish queen Dowager Sophie, and the duchess Dowager of Saxony, Hedwig of Denmark. In her dowry, she brought paintings by Lucas Cranach the Elder.

In 1659, she became a widow, and in 1660 moved to Wittum Husum Castle. Her household at Husum became renowned as a culture center, and she herself a noted patron. She produced an interpretation of the Bible in 1664.

Marriage and issue
She was married on 21 February 1630 to Duke Friedrich III of Holstein-Gottorp and had sixteen children:
 Sofie Auguste (5 December 1630 – 12 December 1680), married on 16 September 1649 to John VI, Prince of Anhalt-Zerbst. Mother of John Louis I, Prince of Anhalt-Dornburg, grandmother of Christian August, Prince of Anhalt-Zerbst, and great-grandmother of Catherine II of Russia.
 Magdalene Sibylle (24 November 1631 – 22 September 1719), married on 28 November 1654 to Gustav Adolph, Duke of Mecklenburg-Güstrow. Mother of Louise of Mecklenburg-Güstrow, Queen of Denmark.
 Johann Adolf (29 September 1632 – 19 November 1633).
 Marie Elisabeth (6 June 1634 – 17 June 1665), married on 24 November 1650 to Louis VI, Landgrave of Hesse-Darmstadt.
 Friedrich (17 July 1635 – 12 August 1654).
 Hedwig Eleonore (23 October 1636 – 24 November 1715), married on 24 October 1654 to King Charles X of Sweden.
 Adolf August (1 September 1637 – 20 November 1637).
 Johann Georg (8 August 1638 – 25 November 1655).
 Anna Dorothea (13 February 1640 – 13 May 1713).
 Christian Albert, Duke of Holstein-Gottorp (3 February 1641 – 6 January 1695).
 Gustav Ulrich (16 March 1642 – 23 October 1642).
 Christine Sabine (11 July 1643 – 20 March 1644).
 August Friedrich (6 May 1646 – 2 October 1705), Prince-Regent of Eutin and Prince-Bishop of Lübeck; married on 21 June 1676 to Christine of Saxe-Weissenfels (daughter of Augustus, Duke of Saxe-Weissenfels, and his first wife Anna Maria of Mecklenburg-Schwerin). No issue.
 Adolf (24 August 1647 – 27 December 1647).
 Elisabeth Sofie (24 August 1647 – 16 November 1647), twin of Adolf.
 Auguste Marie (6 February 1649 – 25 April 1728), married on 15 May 1670 to Frederick VII, Margrave of Baden-Durlach.

Ancestry

References
  Article in the Dansk biografisk Lexicon

|-

Duchesses of Holstein-Gottorp
1610 births
1684 deaths
House of Wettin
German patrons of the arts
Nobility from Dresden
17th-century philanthropists
Albertine branch
Daughters of monarchs